Knežina is a village in the municipality of Sokolac, Bosnia and Herzegovina.

History
In 1991 the area was incorporated into the SAO Romanija, a Serb-established autonomous province, which later merged with other SAOs to form Republika Srpska in 1992.

The present-day settlement of Kadića Brdo was historically a hamlet (zaseok) of Knežina.

Demographic history
According to the 1991 census, the village had 465 inhabitants, out of whom 289 were Muslims (Bosniaks) (62,15%), 170 Serbs (36,56%).

References

Populated places in Sokolac
Romanija plateau